The Amazing Spider-Man is an open world video game based on the Marvel Comics character Spider-Man and the 2012 film of the same name. It was developed by Beenox and published by Activision. It was released on June 26 in North America and on June 29, 2012 in Europe for the Nintendo DS, PlayStation 3, Xbox 360, Wii, Android, iOS, and Microsoft Windows. A version for the Wii U was released  in March 2013 in North America and Europe known as The Amazing Spider-Man: Ultimate Edition in both regions. A PlayStation Vita version was released in November 2013. A sequel, The Amazing Spider-Man 2, was released in April 2014, itself based on the film.

The game was directed by Gerard Lehiany and written by Seamus Kevin Fahey, Benjamin Schirtz and Gérard Lehiany. Its story serves as an alternate epilogue to The Amazing Spider-Man film, which is continued in the game's sequel. Months after the events of the film, a number of cross-species experiments created by Oscorp using Curt Connors' research escape into Manhattan and infect its population with a deadly virus, forcing Spider-Man to join forces with Gwen Stacy and Connors to find a cure. Meanwhile, the new Oscorp CEO, Alistair Smythe, attempts to develop his own cure so that he will be credited as the city's savior, and to eliminate Spider-Man and Connors for interfering with his plans.

The Nintendo 3DS and Wii versions of the game include the script and plot of the other versions of the game, but feature a much different, more linear gameplay that does not have an open world environment, and instead features the player selecting a level from the map in Spider-Man's apartment, before playing a mostly linear level. It was natively designed for the 3DS and later ported to the Wii. Upon its release, the game received mixed to positive reviews from critics, with praise to the gameplay, controls, combat,  dark tone, intensity and soundtrack, although it received criticism for its mode of difficulty, story, visuals, repetitive side missions and lack of innovation.

Gameplay

PlayStation 3, PlayStation Vita, Wii U, Xbox 360 and Microsoft Windows versions
The Amazing Spider-Man is a third-person video game, set in an open world based on Manhattan. Players take on the role of Spider-Man and complete missions—linear scenarios with set objectives—to progress through the story. The missions are structured in a linear manner, but the player is free to explore the game's map in between missions and engage in various side activities. Players have access to all of Spider-Man's superhuman abilities, including web swinging and wall crawling. The game introduces a bullet time mechanic called Web-Rush, where players slow down time by holding a button and can select between different locations that Spider-Man will automatically move towards once the player releases the button. This gameplay mechanic can be used to target enemies, whom Spider-Man will attack automatically, or objects that Spider-Man will throw at enemies, incapacitating them for a few seconds and allowing Spider-Man to web them in order to subdue them for good. The combat system is reminiscent of the Rocksteady Studios' Batman: Arkham series (at the time consisting of Batman: Arkham Asylum and Batman: Arkham City), using a freeflow design and counterattacks. Beenox took a cue from the Batman games, with Dee Brown, the head of Beenox, stating "I played both Batman games and liked them. For me, the Spider-Man character is very different than Batman. You have to approach both in a different way. I think the Rocksteady guys did a good job at providing what was required to make a great Batman game, and we're doing everything we need to this time to make a great Spider-Man game".

The game's side missions include stopping petty crimes, car chases, and gun fights in the streets, recovering missing patients from a psychiatric hospital that escaped early on in the main storyline, and transporting civilians infected by the cross-species virus to quarantine camps. Spider-Man can use his phone to take photographs of evidence that links Oscorp to the cross-species conspiracy, or collect items such as audio files related to the conspiracy. Finding this evidence rewards the player with XP Points, or extra content in the main menu, such as concept art. Players can collect full, vintage comic books, such as Amazing Fantasy #15, as they collect comic covers throughout the game's map.

The game uses a unique damage system: the more damage Spider-Man takes, the more his suit is damaged; returning to the "safe house" repairs the suit. The player can remove a utility belt from the default suit, which holds some extra web fluid. There are ten alternate suits in total, and five of them can be unlocked after completing certain tasks, or taking pictures of secret spider graffiti hidden within the city, such as the Scarlet Spider suit, the Black Suit from the 2007 film Spider-Man 3, a color-inverted version of the Future Foundation suit, the Negative Zone suit, and the Big Time suit. Two more secret suits include the Cross-Species suit (unlocked after completing the main storyline), and a Black Suit version of the 2012 film suit (unlocked after attaining 100% completion), both of which are exclusive to the game. A party hat for "Spidey's 50th anniversary" becomes available if the player changes the date of their console or PC to August 10, 2012.

The game's downloadable content adds new mini-games and suits. For example, the Rhino Challenge downloadable content (DLC) pack adds the classic Spider-Man suit from the Sam Raimi film series and a mini-game where the player controls Rhino as he rampages through the streets of Manhattan, and the Lizard Rampage DLC pack adds the Vigilante suit from the film and a mini-game where the player controls the Lizard as he fights Oscorp mercenaries and destroys beacons across the city.

Nintendo 3DS and Wii versions 
On the Nintendo 3DS and the Wii versions of The Amazing Spider-Man are different than the console and PC version. Although they feature different gameplay, they still share the same plot, voice-overs, and some of the other version's version level design. Instead of featuring an open world environment, in this version employs the player selects a level from a map screen in Spider-Man's apartment, and he can talk to Dr. Connors. Once a level is selected, Spider-Man is dropped off at the start of the level. The game includes some sub-missions that help the player work up their XP.

Due to the lack of free roaming within these versions of the game, players cannot find comic book pages or take pictures of hidden spider graffiti to unlock more suits. The photo mode makes use of the 3DS gyroscope, but can also be more easily controlled by the analog slider.

Spider-Man's moves in this game are more based on the previous moveset from the earlier Spider-Man film based games, and not that of its HD counterpart, although several changes have been made, such as the addition of a "Web Rush" mode (controlled with the Wii Remote's pointer in the Wii version), which allows Spider-Man to slow time down while he is looking for targets to aim at.

The 3DS version has an exclusive game mode named "Vigilante", which is a strategy-based role-playing text game where they are given a map of locations and must complete tasks and missions and collect items needed for certain missions. A meter is shown with a slide moving to either a red or green marker. When Spider-Man successfully completes the mission, the player is awarded with Vigilante Points (VP) and Action Points (AP). The higher skill rank is, more locations and additional content are unlocked. Vigilante is compatible with Street Pass, allowing the player to trade items with other players.

Unlike the other versions of the game, there are only three suits to unlock: which is the Basic, suit  the Classic, suit and the Black Suit. The Basic suit is the default one; the Classic Suit is unlocked by completing all of the side missions; and the Black Suit is unlocked by beating on the Vigilante Mode.

Android and iOS 
Unlike the Wii version, the Android and iOS follows almost the same formula as the console version. Players can explore Manhattan, while having some crimes to deal with. The story is linear, but the player can explore the city before entering the missions. The missions consists in three types: Pursue, where the player pursues Lizard and another enemies in the game, Combat, where fighting and webbing skills can be used to fight enemies to clear an objective. And Mix, in which combat and pursue is combined, and some other things too, like a "sliding" section. The game, just like the console version, has voice acting, free-roam, level system and suit system. In this version, like the Wii version, the player does not unlock all the suits from the console version. Unlike the 3DS version, the Android version does not has additional content like exclusive modes.

Plot 
Months after the incident from the film, Dr. Curt Connors' incarceration, Peter Parker and Gwen Stacy sneak into the restricted areas of Oscorp after hours to investigate rumors of the company continuing Connors' cross-species experiments. They are caught by new Oscorp director Alistair Smythe, who confirms the rumors and gives them a tour of Oscorp's restricted areas to see the experiments themselves. However, the cross-species react to Peter, a cross-species himself, and break out, infecting numerous scientists, including Smythe and Gwen, with a deadly virus they are carrying. A giant scorpion bites and infects Dr. Smythe and a giant vermin rat bites and infects Gwen on her left shoulder. Donning his Spider-Man suit, Peter gets the infected to quarantine, but fails to stop the cross-species from escaping into the city.

After a fight with S-01, a massive cross-species hunting robot created by Smythe, Spider-Man reluctantly breaks Connors out of the Beloit Psychiatric Hospital to help find a cure for the virus. Spider-Man and Connors set up a laboratory at the apartment of Aunt May's friend Stan, and begin development of an antidote while keeping in close contact with Gwen and Smythe via webcam, unaware that Smythe is developing his own "cure" using nanobots that destroy the host from the inside out. After defeating Rhino, one of the escaped cross-species, Spider-Man retrieves Connors' research from a secret Oscorp lab before it gets destroyed. While there, he meets Whitney Chang, an undercover investigative reporter, who enlists Spider-Man's help in unveiling Oscorp's suspicious activities. Spider-Man also collects a blood sample from the rat cross-species, Vermin, for Connors' antidote, while battling a group of "Hunters" - a new type of cross-species hunting robot who identify him as one.

Spider-Man eventually delivers Connors' antidote to Gwen at Oscorp, now under complete quarantine. However, a skeptical Smythe takes and tests it on himself, claiming that, if it works, Oscorp will replicate it and he will take all the credit as the city's savior. However, instead of curing him, the antidote causes Smythe to lose the use of his legs and sanity. Enraged, he commands his robots to eliminate Spider-Man, who escapes after destroying S-02. Realizing that Spider-Man is a unique cross-species who maintains his humanity, Connors creates a new antidote using his DNA, which Spider-Man again delivers to Oscorp, fighting his way past security and the Scorpion cross-species. The antidote works, saving Gwen's and the other scientists' lives.

As the CDC quarantines the city due to the advancement of the virus, Spider-Man, while waiting for Connors to replicate the antidote, returns to his heroic activities. He foils a bank robbery orchestrated by Felicia Hardy, who escaped from Beloit during Spider-Man's initial attempt to break Connors out; assists in the re-capture of Scorpion; stops Rhino from poisoning the city's water supply, and rescues the district attorney from the Iguana cross-species. Meanwhile, Smythe, having been fired from Oscorp for his actions, discovers Spider-Man's secret identity and kidnaps Connors from their apartment, challenging Spider-Man to come and rescue him at Oscorp's robotics facility. While he rescues Connors, Spider-Man is captured by Smythe, who injects him with a nanobot serum that strips away his powers, and reveals his plan to spread the same serum across the city using his greatest invention yet, S-03, unaware that the nanobots are slowly killing the host. Spider-Man escapes and makes his way across a Manhattan consumed by chaos to reach Connors' secret lab, where he reunites with him and Gwen.

While Connors transforms into the Lizard and leaves to try and stop Smythe, Gwen resuscitates the dying Spider-Man with an AED. Realizing that electricity can destroy the nanobots, Spider-Man leaves to assist Connors and boards S-03 with Whitney Chang's help, whereupon he electrocutes himself to destroy the nanobots, regaining his powers. Spider-Man and Connors defeat Smythe, but Connors then succumbs to the Lizard's consciousness and flees into the sewers. Leaving a remorseful Smythe, who regained his sanity, for the police, Spider-Man pursues the Lizard, along the way defeating Natie, the piranha cross-species, and saving Gwen, who has reprogrammed a Hunter to administer the cure across the city. Eventually, Spider-Man defeats and cures the Lizard, whereupon Connors willingly returns to Beloit. As New York slowly returns to normal, both Spider-Man and the Lizard are credited as the city's saviors. Peter and Gwen learn from the news that Smythe has escaped custody but decide to deal with it later.

In a post-credits scene, Smythe, having regained the use of his legs due to being in the final stages of his infection, returns to his lab and commands one of his Hunters to kill him, choosing to die rather than become a cross-species or take Peter and Connors' cure.

Development and marketing 
A video game based on the movie was first announced at the 2011 New York Comic Con. The game was developed by Beenox, the development team behind the previous two Spider-Man games, Spider-Man: Shattered Dimensions and Spider-Man: Edge of Time. During New York Comic Con a producer at Activision, Doug Heder stated that the game will take place after the events of the movie. Heder noticed the mixed reviews with the last video game, promising that the video game will find a different fate, thanks to its lengthy development time. The video game has been reported to be in development by Gerard Lehiany, the creative director of Beenox. Dee Brown of Beenox felt that the movie was an inspiration of the development of the video game on how the creators wanted it to turn out: "The fact that our game is based on the movie, and the movie is re-approaching the universe in a completely different way — a more grounded, more realistic approach — gives us an incredible setting to play with".

The game released on June 26, 2012. The first concept artwork of the game was released on November 10, 2011. A world premiere trailer debuted during the 2011 Spike Video Game Awards, on December 10. The game was originally developed for the Xbox 360, PlayStation 3, Wii, Nintendo DS, and Nintendo 3DS. It was later announced that game will be released for PC, however the port was released on August 10, 2012. The game features PlayStation Move support. The game featured pre-order bonuses.

Downloadable content
Four DLC packs have been released for the PlayStation 3 and Xbox 360 versions. The Rhino Challenge pack was a GameStop exclusive pre-order, and has players control the Rhino and attacking vehicles and thugs throughout the city, and features the 2002-07 suit from the Sam Raimi films as a bonus suit. The Lizard Rampage pack has players control the Lizard and attacking guards while destroying generators, and features the Vigilante suit from The Amazing Spider-Man movie as a bonus suit. The Oscorp Search and Destroy pack has two minigames with similar gameplay to the Snake and Space Invaders. The Stan Lee Adventure pack was an Amazon.com pre-order exclusive, where the player can free roam as Stan Lee (with Spider-Man's powers) around the city, and can also play a special minigame where Stan has to find pages to a script that's dedicated to Spider-Man's 50th anniversary, at the time.

Wii U Ultimate Edition
The Wii U version, call The Amazing Spider-Man: Ultimate Edition, was released March 5 in North America and March 8, 2013, in Europe. It's completely unlike the PS3, the Xbox 360, and the PC versions, and features all downloadable content installed onto the disc. The game also gives the player the option to use the Osphone on the Wii U Gamepad.

PlayStation Vita Port
A PlayStation Vita version of the game was confirmed on the PlayStation Blog on October 11 and released on November 19, 2013.

Reception 

The Amazing Spider-Man received mixed to positive reviews with the PS3 version being the best received game. Aggregating review website Metacritic gave the PlayStation 3 version 71/100, the Xbox 360 version 69/100, the Wii U version 66/100, the Wii version 58/100, and the 3DS version 55/100.

GameSpot gave it a 7.5/10, praising its controls while criticizing its easiness. Game Informer had a more critical view of the game, scoring it 6.75/10, citing failure to live up to potential due to its generic story and repetitive side missions. IGN gave the game a 7.0/10 with Greg Miller saying "the visuals aren't stunning, the story isn't crazy exciting but The Amazing Spider-Man is fun to play". ABC's Good Game were positive with the game with Hex giving a 7 and Bajo an 8 saying, "I was just so happy to have an open world Spider-Man game again, and it's just so much fun swinging around." 1Up.com gave the game a C- and criticized the subpar open world that made the in-game New York City feel like a "post-apocalyptic nightmare-scape."

Sequel 

A narrative sequel taking place in the same universe as in the video game and it based on the movie sequel, was released on April 29, 2014, for Microsoft Windows, Nintendo 3DS, PlayStation 3, PlayStation 4, Wii U, Xbox 360, Xbox One, iOS and Android

References

External links 
 
 

2012 video games
Action-adventure games
Activision games
Android (operating system) games
Beenox games
Cultural depictions of Stan Lee
Open-world video games
IOS games
Mobile games
Nintendo 3DS games
Nintendo 3DS eShop games
Nintendo DS games
Nintendo Network games
PlayStation 3 games
PlayStation Move-compatible games
PlayStation Vita games
Sony Pictures video games
Superhero video games
The Amazing Spider-Man (2012 film series)
Video games about robots 
Video games based on films
Video games based on Spider-Man films
Video games based on adaptations
Video games based on Spider-Man
Video games developed in Canada
Video games about viral outbreaks
Video games scored by Gerard Marino
Video games set in New York City
Video games with alternative versions
Wii games
Wii U games
Wii U eShop games
Windows games
Windows Phone games
Xbox 360 games
Gameloft games
Single-player video games
Other Ocean Interactive games